Ratha Yatra, or Car festival, is any public procession in a chariot. The term particularly refers to the annual Ratha Yatra in Odisha, Jharkhand, West Bengal and other East Indian states, particularly the Odia festival that involve a public procession with a chariot with deities Jagannath (Vishnu avatar), Balabhadra (his brother), Subhadra (his sister) and Sudarshana Chakra (his weapon) on a ratha, a wooden deula-shaped chariot. Ratha Yatra processions have been historically common in Vishnu-related (Jagannath, Rama, Krishna) traditions in Hinduism across India, in Shiva-related traditions, saints and goddesses in Nepal, with Tirthankaras in Jainism, as well as tribal folk religions found in the eastern states of India. Notable Ratha Yatras in India include the Ratha Yatra of Puri, the Dhamrai Ratha Yatra and the Ratha Yatra of Mahesh. Hindu communities outside India, such as in Singapore, celebrate Ratha Yatra such as those associated with Jagannath, Krishna, Shiva and Mariamman. According to Knut Jacobsen, a Ratha Yatra has religious origins and meaning, but the events have a major community heritage, social sharing and cultural significance to the organizers and participants.

Western impressions of the Jagannath Ratha Yatra in Puri as a display of unstoppable force are the origin of the English word juggernaut.

Etymology 
Ratha Yatra is derived from two Sanskrit words, Ratha, which means chariot or carriage, and Yatra which means journey or pilgrimage. In other Indian languages such as Odia, the phonetic equivalents are used, such as jatra.

Description

Ratha Yatra is a journey in a chariot accompanied by the public. It typically refers to a procession (journey) of deities, people dressed like deities, or simply religious saints and political leaders. The term appears in medieval texts of India such as the Puranas, which mention the Ratha Yatra of Surya (Sun god), of Devi (Mother goddess), and of Vishnu. These chariot journeys have elaborate celebrations where the individuals or the deities come out of a temple accompanied by the public journeying with them through the Ksetra (region, streets) to another temple or to the river or the sea. Sometimes the festivities include returning to the sacrosanctum of the temple.

Places

Jagannath Ratha Yatra, Puri

During the Jagannath Ratha Yatra, the triads are usually worshiped in the sanctum of the temple at Puri, but once during the month of Asadha (Rainy Season of Odisha, usually falling in month of June or July), they are brought out onto the Bada Danda (main street of Puri) and travel (3 km) to the Shri Gundicha Temple, in huge chariots (ratha), allowing the public to have darśana (Holy view). This festival is known as Ratha Yatra, meaning the journey (yatra) of the chariots (ratha). The Rathas are huge wheeled wooden structures, which are built anew every year and are pulled by the devotees. The chariot for Jagannath is approximately 45 feet high and 35 feet square . The artists and painters of Puri decorate the chariots and paint flower petals and other designs on the wheels, the wood-carved charioteer and horses, and the inverted lotuses on the wall behind the throne.  The Ratha Yatra is also termed as the Shri Gundicha Yatra.

The most significant ritual associated with the Ratha Yatra is the chhera pahara. During the festival, the Gajapati King wears the outfit of a sweeper and sweeps all around the deities and chariots in the Chera Pahara (sweeping with water) ritual. The Gajapati King cleanses the road before the chariots with a gold-handled broom and sprinkles sandalwood water and powder with utmost devotion.  As per the custom, although the Gajapati King has been considered the most exalted person in the Kalingan kingdom, he still renders the menial service to Jagannath. This ritual signified that under the lordship of Jagannath, there is no distinction between the powerful sovereign Gajapati King and the most humble devotee.

Chera pahara is held on two days, on the first day of the Ratha Yatra, when the deities are taken to garden house at Mausi Maa Temple and again on the last day of the festival, when the deities are ceremoniously brought back to the Shri Mandir.

As per another ritual, when the deities are taken out from the Shri Mandir to the Chariots in Pahandi Vijay.

In the Ratha Yatra, the three deities are taken from the Jagannath Temple in the chariots to the Gundicha Temple, where they stay for nine days. Thereafter, the deities again ride the chariots back to Shri Mandir in bahuda jatra. On the way back, the three chariots halt at the Mausi Maa Temple and the deities are offered Poda Pitha, a kind of baked cake which are generally consumed by the people of Odisha.

The observance of the Ratha Yatra of Jagannath dates back to the period of the Puranas. Vivid descriptions of this festival are found in Brahma Purana, Padma Purana, and Skanda Purana. Kapila Samhita also refers to Ratha Yatra. In Moghul period also, King Ramsingh of Jaipur, Rajasthan has been described as organizing the Ratha Yatra in the eighteenth century. In Odisha, Kings of Mayurbhanj and Parlakhemundi were organizing the Ratha Yatra, though the most grand festival in terms of scale and popularity takes place at Puri.

Moreover, Starza notes that the ruling Ganga dynasty instituted the Ratha Yatra at the completion of the great temple around 1150 AD. This festival was one of those Hindu festivals that was reported to the Western world very early. Friar Odoric of Pordenone visited India in 1316–1318, some 20 years after Marco Polo had dictated the account of his travels while in a Genoese prison. In his own account of 1321, Odoric reported how the people put the "idols" on chariots, and the King and Queen and all the people drew them from the "church" with song and music.

International Jagannath Ratha Yatra

The Ratha Yatra festival has become a common sight in most major cities of the world since 1968 through the Hare Krishna movement. Local chapters put on the festival annually in over a hundred cities worldwide.

Dhamrai Jagannath Rathayatra 

Dhamrai Jagannath Ratha is a chariot temple, a Roth, dedicated to the Hindu God Jagannath located in Dhamrai, Bangladesh. The annual Jagannath Ratha Yatra is a famous Hindu festival attracting thousands of people. The Ratha Yatra in Dhamrai is one of the most important events for the Hindu community of Bangladesh. The original historical Roth was burnt down by the Pakistan Army in 1971 The Roth has since been rebuilt with Indian assistance.

Rathayatra of Mahesh

The Rathayatra of Mahesh is the second oldest chariot festival in India (after the Rath Yatra]] at Puri) and the oldest in Bengal, having been celebrated since 1396 CE. It is a month-long festival held at Mahesh in Serampore of West Bengal and a grand fair is held at that time. People throng to have a share in pulling the long ropes (Roshi) attached to the chariots of Lord Jagannath, Balarama and Subhadra on the journey from the temple to Gundicha Bari (Masir bari) and back. Subhadra is worshipped with Krishna in Jagannath Yatra.

Manipur 

The practice of Ratha Yatra in Manipur was introduced in the nineteenth century. The Khaki Ngamba chronicle mentions that on a Monday in either April or May 1829, the King of Manipur Gambhir Singh was passing through Sylhet whilst on a British expedition against the Khasis. Two processions were being prepared by Sylhet's Muslim and Hindu communities respectively. The Islamic month of Muharram in the history of Sylhet was a lively time during which tazia processions were common. This happened to fall on the same day as Ratha Yatra. Sensing possible communal violence, the Faujdar of Sylhet, Ganar Khan, requested the Hindu community to delay their festival by one day. Contrary to the Nawab's statement, a riot emerged between the two communities. As a Hindu himself, Singh managed to defend the Hindus and disperse the Muslim rioters with his Manipuri troops. The Ratha Yatra was not delayed, and Singh stayed to take part in it. Revered by the Hindu community as a defender of their faith, he enjoyed the procession and initiated the practice of celebrating Ratha Yatra and worshipping Jagannath in his own homeland of Manipur.

Examples

 Ratha-Jatra, Puri, at Puri in the state of Odisha, is the largest and most visited Ratha Yatra in the world attracting a large crowd every year.
 Baripada Ratha Yatra is the second oldest in the world. So Baripada is also called as Dwitiya Shrikhetra or 2nd Puri. Ratha Jatra has been celebrated here since 1575 without any interruption.
 Ratha Yatra of Kendujhar is the second largest Ratha Yatra in the world. The Keonjhar Ratha (Chariot) - Nandighosh is the Tallest Ratha in the World.
 Rath Yatra (Ahmedabad) - Ratha Yatra also takes place in Ahmedabad, Gujarat State, which is known to be the third largest in the world.
 Sukinda Ratha Yatra in Odisha is also known to attract a large number of devotees.
 Dhamrai Rathayatra, at Dhamrai in Bangladesh, is the most famous Ratha Yatra in Bangladesh.
 ISKCON Dhaka Ratha Jatra is the second famous Ratha Jatra in Bangladesh.
 Rajbalhat Ratha Jatra, West Bengal, India.

 People of Bastar region observe Ratha Yatra during Dussehara.
 Radha Rani Ratha Yatra, held at the Radha Madhav Dham temple near Austin, Texas, U.S.A.
 Ratha Yatra in Silicon Valley is organized at Golden Gate Park, San Francisco, California, USA.

See also
 Mahishadal Rathayatra
 Guptipara Rathayatra
 Ratha
 Yatra
 Yatra (disambiguation)
 Jatra (disambiguation)
 Hindu pilgrimage sites in India
 List of Hindu festivals
 Padayatra
 Tirtha (Hinduism)
 Tirtha and Kshetra

Notes

References

Bibliography

 
 
 

Hindu festivals
June observances
July observances
Hindu festivals in India
Hinduism in Odisha